The Gacaca courts were a system of community justice in Rwanda following the 1994 genocide. The term 'gacaca' can be translated as 'short grass' referring to the public space where neighborhood male elders (abagabo) used to meet to solve local problems. The name of this system was then adopted in 2001 as the title of the state's new criminal justice system "Gacaca Courts" (Inkiko Gacaca) to try those deemed responsible for the 1994 Rwandan genocide where over an estimated 500,000 people were killed, tortured and raped. In 1994, the United Nations Security Council created the International Criminal Tribunal for Rwanda to try high-ranking government and army officials accused of genocide, war crimes, and crimes against humanity. The Gacaca Courts were established in law in 2001, began to operate on a trial basis in 2002 and eventually came to operate as trials throughout the country by early 2007.

The Gacaca courts were presented as a method of transitional justice, claimed by the Rwandan government to promote communal healing and rebuilding in the wake of the Rwandan Genocide. Rwanda has especially focused on community rebuilding placing justice in the hands of trusted citizens. However, the system has come under criticism from a number of sources, including the Survivors Fund, which represents survivors of the genocide, due to the danger that it poses to survivors and there have been a number of reports on survivors being targeted for giving evidence at the courts. Scholars have shown how the courts became a critical mechanism for establishing the government's official narrative on the genocide, recognizing only Tutsi as victims and Hutu as perpetrators.

History of Gacaca
Within 17th century Rwanda, prior to colonization, the extended lineage or family (umuryango), which encompassed several households (inzu), was the main unit of social organization within Rwandan society. The status of people within families was based upon the age and sex of the person. Only aged married men, without living parents, were independent while all others, especially women, were dependent upon what the men dictated. The family lineage controlled arranged marriages, ancestral traditions and ceremonies, the payment or retrieval of debts, and was the primary source of security for people.

Ruling over these lineages were kings (mwami). Within Rwanda, kings ruled over many different sections of Rwanda. The king, within Rwandan society, embodied power, justice, and knowledge and was the mediator of any major dispute within their region. However, before disputes were brought to the kings, they were heard locally by wise men as what is referred to as Gacaca.

The name Gacaca is derived from the Kinyarwanda word umucaca meaning “a plant so soft to sit on that people prefer to gather on it”. Originally, Gacaca gatherings were meant to restore order and harmony within communities by acknowledging wrongs and having justice restored to those who were victims.

However, with the colonization of Rwanda and the arrival of western systems of law, Rwandan society soon began to change as a whole. With this implementation and usage of western legal systems, Rwandans began to go to courts to deal with their disputes. In turn, kings and wisemen soon began to lose their legitimacy within Rwandan society. And with this loss of legitimacy, Gacaca courts began to dwindle down in numbers.

Post-Genocide Gacaca
After the conclusion of the genocide against the Tutsi, the new Rwandan government was having difficulty prosecuting approximately 130,000 alleged perpetrators of the genocide. Originally, perpetrators of the genocide were to be tried in the ICTR (International Criminal Tribunal for Rwanda); however, the vast number of perpetrators made it highly improbable that they would all be convicted.

Given that there were insufficient resources to organise first-world courts, the Gacaca system had to be preferred over the only alternative to the Gacaca system for local communities which might have been revenge.

To deal with this problem, Gacaca courts were installed, the goal of which was to:
 Establish truth about what happened
 Accelerate the legal proceedings for those accused of Genocide Crimes
 Eradicate the culture of impunity
 Reconcile Rwandans and reinforce their unity
 Use the capacities of Rwandan society to deal with its problems through a justice-based Rwandan custom.

The categorization of Gacaca courts in Rwanda is based on the concept of a cell and a sector. A cell is equivalent to a small community while a sector is equivalent to a small group of cells making up a village. Within these two categories, there were 9013 cells and 1545 sectors, with over 12,103 Gacaca courts established nationwide. Presiding over the Gacaca meetings are judges known as inyangamugayo. These judges are elected to serve on a nine-person council. During the Gacaca process, there were two phases which took place. Starting between 2005 and 2006, information was taken from those who were accused from all Gacaca cells. The approximate number of those who were accused was 850,000 with about 50,000 of those being deceased.

The categorization of crimes committed by these 850,000 is as follows:

June 2004–March 2007

March 2007 Onwards

The approximate number of people who were to be tried in these three categories:

Category 1: 77,269

Category 2: 432,557

Category 3: 308,739

Predecessors and partners in justice

The spontaneous emergence of the Gacaca activities and the gradual support for Gacaca by the authorities was clearly motivated by the fact that the ordinary justice system was virtually non-existent after the genocide. The Gacaca had to do what it did before—relieve the pressure on the ordinary courts. These were now not working slowly, as they did before, but not working at all. Once they started to work, they were quickly overloaded with the cases of genocide suspects who were filling the prisons. This new form of justice was bold, but not unprecedented: This becomes evident when one considers the emerging numbers of Truth and Reconciliation Commissions (TRC) as, for example, that in South Africa. The slogan of the South African TRC “Revealing is Healing” and its argument that truth-telling serves as a “therapeutic function” underlies this assumption. The TRC format was suggested to the Rwandan government, but ultimately they chose to pursue mass justice through Gacaca; a system where their country had roots and familiarity.

Another form of Rwandan justice which has worked alongside Gacaca is the International Criminal Tribunal for Rwanda (ICTR). The United Nations Security Council established the International Criminal Tribunal for Rwanda to "prosecute persons responsible for genocide and other serious violations of international humanitarian law committed in the territory of Rwanda and neighbour States, between 1 January 1994 and 31 December 1994". The Tribunal is located in Arusha, Tanzania, and has offices in Kigali, Rwanda. Its Appeals Chamber is located in The Hague, Netherlands. Since it opened in 1995, the Tribunal has indicted 93 individuals whom it considered responsible for serious violations of international humanitarian law committed in Rwanda in 1994. The ICTR has played a pioneering role in the establishment of a credible international criminal justice system and is the first ever international tribunal to deliver verdicts in relation to genocide, and the first to interpret the definition of genocide set forth in the 1948 Geneva Conventions. It also is the first international tribunal to define rape in international criminal law and to recognise rape as a means of perpetrating genocide.

The ICTR delivered its last trial judgement on 20 December 2012 in the Ngirabatware case. Following this milestone, the Tribunal's remaining judicial work now rests solely with the Appeals Chamber. As of October 2014, only one case comprising six separate appeals is pending before the ICTR Appeals Chamber. One additional appeal from ICTR trial judgement was delivered in December 2014 in the Ngirabatware case by the appeals chamber of the Mechanism for International Criminal Tribunals, which started assuming responsibility for the ICTR's residual functions on 1 July 2012. The ICTR's formal closure is scheduled to coincide with the return of the Appeals Chamber's judgement in its last appeal. Until the return of that judgement in 2015, the ICTR will continue its efforts to end impunity for those responsible for the Genocide through a combination of judicial, outreach, and capacity-building efforts. Through these efforts, the ICTR will fulfil its mandate of bringing justice to the victims of the Genocide and, in the process, hopes to deter others from committing similar atrocities in the future.

Successes 
Rwanda's experiment in mass community-based justice has been a mixed success. Rwandans are deeply divided on the benefits of Gacaca. Rwandan government supporters (including both foreign academics and local Rwandans) claim that it has shed light on what happened in their local communities during the 100 days of genocide in 1994. Many Rwandans not aligned with the government say it became a way of disseminating "lies," distorting the history about what happened in 1994. Scholars have shown that it became a means of silencing alternative narratives amongst the Rwandan population and effectively worked as a form of "show trial". Other scholars say it helped some families find murdered relatives’ bodies which they could finally bury with some dignity. It has also ensured that tens of thousands of perpetrators were brought to justice. Some Rwandans say that it has helped set in motion reconciliation within their communities. The majority of praise for Gacaca has come from Rwanda's government and the Rwandan citizens who have direct experience with the system. Naturally this is a biased source, however it is important to note that it is those most affected by the Rwandan genocide who are offering praise, citing a sense of closure, acceptance, and forgiveness following Gacaca trials. The Gacaca trials also served to promote reconciliation by providing a means for victims to learn the truth about the death of their family members and relatives. They also gave perpetrators the opportunity to confess their crimes, show remorse and ask for forgiveness in front of their community.

In addition to success on a more personal level, the enormity of the operation speaks measures: More than 12,000 community-based courts tried more than 1.2 million cases throughout the country.

Criticisms

Legal criticism 
The casual format of Gacaca has led to many legal criticisms of the format which include the following: no right to a lawyer, no right to be presumed innocent until proven guilty, no right to be informed of charges being brought against you, no right to case/defense preparation time, no right to be present at one's own trial, no right to confront witnesses, no right against self incrimination, no right against double jeopardy, no right against arbitrary arrest and detention, and furthermore, there is vast evidence of corruption among officials. "You have to give money. Gacaca judges are not paid so they make arrangements to get money from those who are accused," said a man accused of genocide who said he had paid a bribe to Gacaca judges. The lack of legal representation is, in the majority, a result of the genocide itself wherein the vast majority of people of such professions were casualties. This brings, perhaps, the biggest issue of Gacaca: the lack of legal representation. Gacaca functions using "people of integrity" as judges, lawyers, and the jury. Not only are some of these people perpetrators themselves, but the lack of financial compensation for the position and the lack of training make them susceptible to bribery and to leading unfair trials.

Senior Human Rights Watch adviser Alison Des Forges said the lack of legal representation was a serious concern. "The authorities' view is that this is a quasi-customary kind of procedure, and there never used to be lawyers, so there's no need for lawyers now. The problem with that is that little is the same except for the name. In this system, there is considerable weight given to the official side. The office of the prosecutor provides considerable assistance to the bench [of judges] in terms of making its determination, so you no longer have a level playing field." There may, however, be no alternative to the Gacaca trials, she added. "Obviously the problem of delivering justice after the genocide is an overwhelming problem. Gacaca may not be ideal but there is at this point no alternative.... The official explanation I think is that people did not speak openly until the Gacaca process and now many more accusations are surfacing. Also, the concession program, which requires the naming of all those who participated along with the accused [in return for a lighter sentence], has led to a multiplication of names. "How many of these are well-founded, what is the credibility of the evidence, these are very serious concerns."

There are criticisms and controversy surrounding the decision to implement Gacaca courts. Human rights groups worry about the fairness since trials are held without lawyers which means that there is less protection for defendants than in conventional courts. In addition conventional trials have seen false accusations and intimidation of witnesses on both sides; issues of revenge have been raised as a concern. The acquittal rate has been 20 percent which suggests a large number of trials were not well-founded. Also because the trials are based on witnesses' testimonies, the length of time between the crime and trial heightens the risk that the witnesses' memories will be unreliable.

Removal of RPF crimes 
The government's decision to exclude crimes committed by soldiers of the current ruling party, the RPF, from Gacaca courts' jurisdiction has left victims of their crimes still waiting for justice, Human Rights Watch said. Soldiers of the RPF, which ended the genocide in July 1994 and went on to form the current government, killed tens of thousands of people between April and December 1994. In 2004, the Gacaca law was amended to exclude such crimes, and the government worked to ensure that these crimes were not discussed in Gacaca.

"One of the serious shortcomings of gacaca has been its failure to provide justice to all victims of serious crimes committed in 1994", Bekele said. "By removing RPF crimes from their jurisdiction, the government limited the potential of the gacaca courts to foster long-term reconciliation in Rwanda."

"The biggest problem with gacaca is the crimes we can't discuss. We're told that certain crimes, those killings by the RPF, cannot be discussed in gacaca even though the families need to talk. We're told to be quiet on these matters. It's a big problem. It's not justice," said a relative of a victim of crimes by soldiers of the current ruling party.

Reconciliation 
Though Gacaca was claimed to contribute to reconciliation by the Rwandan government it functioned fundamentally as a punitive form of justice which many scholars have characterized as retributive in focus rather than reconciliatory in nature. Punishments ranged from forced labor in public works projects (TIG) to life in prison without family visits ("special measures"). Despite its claimed restorative nature, Gacaca is a legal process and with this in mind punishment constitutes a major element of the Gacaca courts. According to official Rwandan government records the courts had a conviction rate of 86% and tried over a million suspects.

See also
 Court of law
 Crime against humanity
 Ethnic cleansing
 History of Rwanda
 Politics of Rwanda
 Rwandan genocide
 Survivors Fund
 International Criminal Tribunal for Rwanda

References

Sources
 Harrell, Peter E., Rwanda's Gamble: Gacaca and a New Model of Transitional Justice. New York: Writer's Advantage Press, 2003.
 Human Rights Watch. 2004. Struggling to Survive: Barriers to Justice for Rape Victims in Rwanda. New York: Human Rights Watch. Available: http://hrw.org/reports/2004/rwanda0904/rwanda0904.pdf.
 Ingelaere, Bert., 2016. Inside Rwanda's Gacaca Courts: Searching Justice after Genocide.  Madison: University of Wisconsin Press.
 Reyntjens, Filip and Stef Vandeginste. 2005. "Rwanda: An Atypical Transition." In Roads to Reconciliation, edited by Elin Skaar, et al. Lanham, MD: Lexington Books.
 Stover, Eric and Weinstein, Harvey (2004). My Neighbor, My Enemy: Justice and Community in the Aftermath of Mass Atrocity. Cambridge: Cambridge University Press. .

Literature
 Buckley-Zistel, Susanne (2006): 'The Truth Heals?' Gacaca Jurisdictions and the Consolidation of Peace in Rwanda. Die Friedens-Warte Heft 1–2, pp. 113–130.
 Clark, Phil (2012) "How Rwanda judged its genocide"  London: Africa Research Institute
 Clark, Phil (2010) The Gacaca Courts, Post-Genocide Justice and Reconciliation in Rwanda: Justice Without Lawyers. Cambridge: Cambridge University Press.
 Simon Gabisirege/Stella Babalola (2001): Perceptions about the Gacaca Law in Rwanda. Baltimore: Johns Hopkins University.
Geraghty, Mark Anthony. 2020. Gacaca, Genocide, Genocide Ideology: The Violent Aftermaths of Transitional Justice in the New Rwanda. Comparative Studies in Society and History, Vol. 62, Issue 3, p. 588–618.
 Ingelaere, Bert., (2016) Inside Rwanda's Gacaca Courts: Searching Justice after Genocide.  Madison: University of Wisconsin Press.
 Longman, Timothy (2017) Memory and Justice in Post-Genocide Rwanda. New York: Cambridge University Press.
 Stover, Eric and Harvey Weinstein (eds) (2004) My Neighbor, My Enemy: Justice and Community in the Aftermath of mass Atrocity. Cambridge: Cambridge University Press.

External links
 National Service of Gacaca Jurisdictions Official Rwandan government website

Inkiko Gacaca

Law of Rwanda
Rwandan genocide
Courts by type
Penal system in Rwanda
Transitional justice